The 1958 New York Yankees season was the 56th season for the team. The team finished with a record of 92–62, winning their 24th pennant, finishing 10 games ahead of the Chicago White Sox. In the World Series, they defeated the Milwaukee Braves in 7 games. New York was managed by Casey Stengel. The Yankees played their home games at Yankee Stadium. In 1958, the Yankees became New York City's only professional baseball team after the Brooklyn Dodgers moved to Los Angeles and the New York Giants left for San Francisco. The Yankees would hold this distinction until 1962, when the New York Mets began play.

Offseason
 December 2, 1957: Harry Chiti was drafted from the Yankees by the Kansas City Athletics in the 1957 rule 5 draft.
 Prior to 1958 season: Rich Barry was signed as an amateur free agent by the Yankees.

Regular season

Season standings

Record vs. opponents

Notable transactions
 May 14, 1958: Al Cicotte was purchased from the Yankees by the Washington Senators.

Roster

Player stats

Batting

Starters by position
Note: Pos = Position; G = Games played; AB = At bats; H = Hits; Avg. = Batting average; HR = Home runs; RBI = Runs batted in

Other batters
Note: G = Games played; AB = At bats; H = Hits; Avg. = Batting average; HR = Home runs; RBI = Runs batted in

Pitching

Starting pitchers
Note: G = Games pitched; IP = Innings pitched; W = Wins; L = Losses; ERA = Earned run average; SO = Strikeouts

Other pitchers
Note: G = Games pitched; IP = Innings pitched; W = Wins; L = Losses; ERA = Earned run average; SO = Strikeouts

Relief pitchers
Note: G = Games pitched; W = Wins; L = Losses; SV = Saves; ERA = Earned run average; SO = Strikeouts

1958 World Series 

AL New York Yankees (4) vs. NL Milwaukee Braves (3)

Awards and honors
 Elston Howard, Babe Ruth Award
 Bob Turley, Cy Young Award
 Turley became the first American League pitcher to win the Cy Young Award.
All-Star Game

Farm system

LEAGUE CHAMPIONS: Binghamton, Fargo-Moorhead, St. Petersburg

Notes

References
1958 New York Yankees at Baseball Reference
1958 World Series
1958 New York Yankees at Baseball Almanac

New York Yankees seasons
New York Yankees
New York Yankees
1950s in the Bronx
American League champion seasons
World Series champion seasons